Memorial Address (stylized in sentence case) is the first extended play (EP) by Japanese recording artist Ayumi Hamasaki. It was released on December 17, 2003 by Avex Trax. Memorial Address is Hamasaki's longest extended play with a total of eight tracks. The album's composition and arrangement was handled by several musicians, such as Tetsuya Yukumi, Bounceback, CMJK, Dai Nagao, among others. Hamasaki contributed to the album as the primary and background vocalist, composer, and songwriter to every song. Three different formats were released to promote the album: a standalone CD, a CD and DVD bundle, and a digital release. It was Hamasaki's first album to be released as a CD+DVD package, a marketing strategy her label would often employ throughout her career.

Upon the album's release, it was met with favourable reviews from music critics. Critics highlight individual songs for their production and composition, and commended the singles' commercial appeal. Memorial Address became Hamasaki's first extended play to reach the top spot on Japan's Oricon Albums Chart. It was certified million by the Recording Industry Association of Japan (RIAJ) for shipments of one million units in that region, making it the first extended play by a female artist to achieve this. Two singles and one EP were released from the album. Hamasaki promoted the EP on her 2003 and 2004 arena tour in Japan.

Background and composition
Memorial Address is Hamasaki's first extended play (EP). It is currently her longest EP with eight tracks, tallying up to nearly 40 minutes. For the album, Hamasaki's record label Avex Trax hired several Japanese musicians, such as Tetsuya Yukumi, Bounceback, CMJK, Dai Nagao, among others. Those producers are just some of whom worked with Hamasaki on her fourth studio album, the predecessor Rainbow (2002). Memorial Address is also Hamasaki's first extended play to be composed, arranged, and produced by Japanese producers and composers. She contributed to the album as the primary and background vocalist, composer, and songwriter to every song. She composed two songs with Nagao; "Hanabi: Episode II" and "Forgiveness".

Track listing

Release history

Charts
Oricon Sales Chart (Japan)

 Total Sales: 1,115,000 (Japan)
 Total Sales: 1,410,000 (Avex)
  Highest selling mini-album by a female artist.
  Only mini-album by a female artist to sell over one million units.

Singles

Total Single Sales: 1,365,000

Total Album and Single Sales:  2,480,000

Notes

References

Ayumi Hamasaki EPs
2003 EPs
Avex Group EPs
Japanese-language EPs